The Republican National Coalition for Life (RNCL), often stylized as RNC/Life, is an organization formed to maintain the commitment of the Republican Party of the United States to anti-abortion principles. Its current executive director is Colleen Parro.

History
RNC/Life was founded by Phyllis Schlafly in the autumn of 1990 after two groups, Republicans for Choice and National Republican Coalition for Choice, publicly announced their intention to provoke a floor fight at the 1992 Republican National Convention in Houston, Texas in order to remove the anti-abortion plank from the convention platform.

The Republican Party has been the anti-abortion national political party since a resolution in support of efforts to secure a Human Life Amendment to the United States Constitution was adopted at the 1976 Republican National Convention, following the 1973 Roe v. Wade decision.

See also
Democrats for Life of America
Libertarians for Life
Republican Majority for Choice
United States anti-abortion movement

External links
Official website

Anti-abortion organizations in the United States
Life
Organizations established in 1990